Borba (Russian for 'Struggle') was a group of Russian leftwing writers residing abroad, which considered itself part of the Russian Social Democratic Labour Party; it took shape as an independent group in Paris in 1901. Since it departed from Social-Democratic views and tactics, engaged in disorganising activities, and had no contacts with Social-Democratic organisations in Russia, the group was not allowed representation at the Second Party Congress. It was dissolved by decision of that Congress.

References

Factions of the Russian Social Democratic Labour Party
Defunct socialist parties in Russia
Political parties in the Russian Empire
Russian diaspora in France
Social democratic parties in Russia